Wayra Lupi Qullu (Aymara wayra wind, lupi sun ray, qullu mountain, also spelled Huayra Lupe Kkollu) is a  mountain in the Andes of Bolivia. It is located in the La Paz Department, Pacajes Province, Charaña Municipality. It lies at the river Phaq'u Q'awa ("brown brook", Pacokhaua) which later is named Achuta. Wayra Lupi Qullu is situated east of the mountains Ch'iyara Salla and Kunturiri.

References 

Mountains of La Paz Department (Bolivia)